Abba Habib was a Nigerian politician who was general secretary of the Northern People's Congress and later became a regional minister for Trade in the First Republic.

He was a Shuwa Arab from Dikwa. He was a major political figure who represented the province of Northern Cameroons in the Northern Regional Assembly and later led the province to merge with the Northern Region of Nigeria.

Northern People's Congress politicians
Possibly living people
Year of birth missing